"Why I Left Harry's All-Night Hamburgers" is a science fiction short story by Lawrence Watt-Evans. It was first published in Asimov's Science Fiction.

Plot summary
A young man tells his story about growing up working at a greasy spoon diner near Sutton, West Virginia. Late at night it happened to be a hang-out for unusual travelers from alternate versions of Earth. After being tantalized by descriptions of far-off wonders, the young man begins to dream of hitching a ride in one of the "traveler's" vehicles.

Reception and adaptation
"Harry's" won the 1988 Hugo Award for Best Short Story, and was nominated for the 1987 Nebula Award for Best Short Story. The short story is in development by Warner Brothers for a movie release.

References

External links
 

Science fiction short stories
1987 short stories
Hugo Award for Best Short Story winning works
Alternate history short stories